Sugar Babies is a musical revue conceived by Ralph G. Allen and Harry Rigby, with music by Jimmy McHugh, lyrics by Dorothy Fields and Al Dubin and various others. The show is a tribute to the old burlesque era.  (The show's name is taken from one of many shows on the old Mutual Burlesque wheel of the Roaring Twenties.) First produced in 1979 on Broadway and running nearly three years, the revue attracted warm notices and was given subsequent touring productions.

Productions

Sugar Babies opened on Broadway at the Mark Hellinger Theatre on October 8, 1979 and closed on August 28, 1982 after 1,208 performances. Staging and choreography was by Ernest Flatt, with sketches directed by Rudy Tronto, musically directed by Glen Roven, scenic and costume design by Raoul Pene Du Bois, lighting design by Gilbert Vaughn Hemsley Jr., vocal arrangements and lyrics by Arthur Malvin, additional vocal arrangements by Hugh Martin, Ralph Blane, and orchestrations by Dick Hyman.

The revue starred Mickey Rooney in his Broadway debut, Ann Miller, and featured Ann Jillian and Peter Leeds. After the original stars left, successors included Juliet Prowse,  Anita Morris, Joey Bishop, Eddie Bracken, Jeff Dunham and Rip Taylor.

The revue subsequently had a short-lived National tour which starred Carol Channing and Robert Morse, from August through November 1980. The 1982 Bus and Truck Tour starred Eddie Bracken and Jaye P. Morgan (who was succeeded by Mimi Hines). The 2nd National Tour, in 1984 and 1985, reunited Rooney and Miller.

Concept

Norman Abbott, nephew of famed straight man Bud Abbott, inherited his uncle's "treasure trove of burlesque material, including written gags, props, music, and posters." Inspired, the younger Abbott and his wife had an idea:

Norman and his wife conceived of a modern Broadway musical combining all the elements of burlesque. He then came to the conclusion that the only person alive who could pull this off as a headliner was Mickey Rooney. - Richard Lertzman and William J. Birnes, in "The Life and Times of Mickey Rooney"

After two weeks of rehearsals, however, Rooney clashed with Abbott, who was directing the show. Rooney, who insisted on taking a hand in staging the comedy scenes himself, told Abbott, "This isn't going to work out." Abbott was fired as director, and although he didn't have a contract, he sued producer Harry Rigby and received a six-figure settlement. 

(Ralph G. Allen) visited theaters around the country, sitting with elderly comics and taking down their routines. He amassed a collection of some 5,000 comedy sketches. He considered writing a book, but Dr. Allen realized it would be much more fun to put on a show. He wrote a revue, based on the sketches, which was performed at the University of Tennessee. Some time later, Dr. Allen gave a talk in New York at a conference on early-20th-century popular entertainment. As part of his lecture, he read the script of his revue. Afterward, he was approached by a member of the audience, Mr. Rigby, a producer.

In 1977, at a "scholarly four‐day conference to study the History of American Popular Entertainment" at the New York Public Library for the Performing Arts, Ralph G. Allen, a theater professor and historian fascinated with burlesque, presented a lecture, from a prior College of Fellows of the American Theatre Address, with pieces of a revue he wrote, that borrowed material from long-forgotten burlesque routines, "At My Mother's Knee (and Other Low Joints)". Rigby was in the audience and approached Allen about the material, and together they wrote the book for the show. Sugar Babies debuted two years later.

The show consists of old burlesque blackout gags and sketches, interspersed with song and dance numbers, and vaudeville specialty acts. Typical of the risqué jokes was this one in the "Broken Arms Hotel" sketch:

DESK CLERK (on the telephone): Broken Arms Hotel...  What's that? You say you got a leak in the bathtub?... Well, go ahead! You paid for the room!

The Sugar Babies score contains standards such as "Don't Blame Me" and "I Feel a Song Comin' On", and newly created musical numbers, including "The Sugar Baby Bounce".

The show had burlesque "tropes" such as the swing number, the sister act, the fan dance, the vaudeville dog act. "It was all fast and funny and it ended with a patriotic number...with the entire company in red, white, and blue with a flag background and Miller as the Statue of Liberty."

Songs and scenes
Source: Script

Act 1
Scene: A Memory of Burlesque
A Good Old Burlesque Show
Scene: Welcome to the Gaity
Let Me Be Your Sugar Baby
Scene: Meet Me Round the Corner
Scene: Travelin'
In Louisiana
Goin' Back to New Orleans
Scene: The Broken Arms Hotel
Scene: Feathered Fantasy (Salute to Sally Rand)
Sally
Scene: The Pitchmen
Scene: Ellis Island Lament
Immigration Rose
Scenes from Domestic Life
Scene: Torch Song
Scene: Orientale
Scene: The Little Red Schoolhouse
Scene: The New Candy-Coated Craze
The Sugar Baby Bounce
Scene: Special Added Attraction
Down At the Gaiety Burlesque
Mr. Banjo Man

Act 2
Scene: Candy Butcher
Scene: Girls and Garters
I'm Keeping Myself Available For You
Exactly Like You
Scene: Justice Will Out
Scene: In A Greek Garden
Warm and Willing
Scene: Presenting Madame Alla Gazaza
Scene: Tropical Madness
Cuban Love Song
Scene: Cautionary Tales
McHugh Medley
Every Day Another Tune
I Can't Give You Anything but Love, Baby
I'm Shooting High
When You and I Were Young, Maggie Blues
On the Sunny Side of the Street
Scene: Presenting Bob Williams
Scene: Old Glory
You Can't Blame Your Death on Uncle Sammy

Reception
Time wrote that the show is a "happy send-off to burlesque", and "Rarely has so much energy been packed into so small a package. Rooney dances, he sings, he mugs, he dresses in drag."

Awards and nominations

Original Broadway production

References

External links
Internet Broadway Database listing
Playbill News, on the September 9, 2004, death of Ralph G. Allen

1979 musicals
Broadway musicals